Heinz Schulz-Neudamm (born Paul Heinz Otto Schulz; 7 July 1899 – 13 May 1969) was a German graphic designer and illustrator. He is best known for designing posters for films. The poster for Metropolis is considered the world's highest-valued poster.

References 

Film poster artists
German graphic designers
German illustrators
1899 births
1969 deaths